Jorge Martín Aruga Torales (born 4 October 1998) is an Argentine professional footballer who plays as a left-back for Patronato.

Career
Aruga had youth stints in Paraná with local clubs with Universitario and Belgrano, before progressing through the academy of Patronato. He was moved into the latter's first-team during the 2018–19 campaign, with his senior debut arriving in March 2019 as he played the full duration of a Copa Argentina penalty shoot-out victory over Primera C Metropolitana's Dock Sud. Aruga didn't appear in the Primera División in 2018–19, though would eventually make his league bow in 2019–20 on 6 October 2019 at the Estadio Monumental Antonio Vespucio Liberti against River Plate; again, playing the full ninety minutes.

Career statistics
.

References

External links

1998 births
Living people
People from Paraná, Entre Ríos
Argentine footballers
Association football defenders
Argentine Primera División players
Club Atlético Patronato footballers
San Martín de San Juan footballers
Gimnasia y Esgrima de Mendoza footballers
Sportspeople from Entre Ríos Province